Blonder Tongue Audio Baton (sometimes spelled Blondertongueaudiobaton) is the debut studio album by Swirlies, released on CD, LP and cassette. The majority of the album was recorded in the summer of 1992 at Q Division Studios, Boston with engineer/co-producer Rich Costey. It is possibly their best-known and most critically praised work, with many critics citing it as a "lo-fi" answer to My Bloody Valentine's Loveless. AllMusic calls it "a mainstay of early-'90s indie music." In 2016, Pitchfork ranked the album at number 11 on its list of the 50 best shoegaze albums of all time.

Background
Swirlies began work on Blonder Tongue Audio Baton after signing to Taang! Records in the summer of 1992 and compiling the EP, What To Do Abut Them. The band booked time at Q Division Studios with engineer/co-producer Rich Costey to record a dozen songs that the group had been playing live for the past two years. At Q Division Swirlies made use of the studio's collection of vintage keyboards, including Mellotron and Moog synthesizers, to widen the palette of sounds they'd previously created as a guitar-bass-drums indie rock group. Drummers Kevin March and Mark Rivers from Boston bands Dambuilders and Cavedogs were brought on for most of the album's tracks as Swirlies founding drummer Ben Drucker only played on two songs during the Q Division recording session. A different arrangement of the band's 1992 single, "Park the Car (by the Side of the Road)" (named for a song lyric by The Smiths) was recorded but scrapped in favor of the earlier version. Singer/guitarists Damon Tutunjian and Seana Carmody also recorded the songs "His Life of Academic Freedom" and "Wait Forever" at home on 4-track cassette, and artist Ron Regé, Jr. contributed between-song soundbites as he had on the group's prior EP.

The album is named after an obscure and expensive audio graphic equalizer, made by Blonder Tongue Labs from 1959–61, which was used extensively while tracking the album. Taang! Records released the album in February 1993 and the band toured to support it.

Brokedick Car EP
The five-song Brokedick Car EP was released later in 1993 on vinyl, CD, and cassette tape as a follow-up to Blonder Tongue Audio Baton, and featured different mixes of "Wrong Tube" and "Pancake" from the album. The EP's final track was "House of Pancake", an electronica remix of "Pancake" by Rich Costey and NYC electronic musician Gomi. The track comprised Swirlies' first foray into electronic music. Two more experimental tracks, the atonal instrumental "Labrea Tarpit" and the Pavementesque art punk song "You're Just Jealous", rounded out Brokedick Car. These were the last songs recorded by the band's original lineup, as Drucker and Carmody soon left the group.

Legacy
Blonder Tongue Audio Baton was co-lead singer Seana Carmody's last full album with the group before she formed the Farfisa-driven and somewhat more pop-oriented Syrup USA. In 2015 most of Swirlies' original line up reunited to perform the entirety of Blonder Tongue Audio Baton as a live set in Brooklyn on the 4th of July as part of the band's 25th anniversary tour. Taang! Records reissued the album on LP in 2016.

Track listing 
All tracks by Swirlies
 "Bell (Prelude)" – 0:12
 "Bell" – 4:29
 "Vigilant Always" – 5:10
 "His Love Just Washed Away" – 5:24
 "His Life of Academic Freedom" – 2:07
 "Pancake" – 3:15
 "Jeremy Parker" – 4:14
 "Park the Car (by the Side of the Road)" – 5:04
 "Tree Chopped Down" – 3:12
 "Wrong Tube" – 5:06
 "Wait Forever" – 4:18

Brokedick Car EP
"Wrong Tube (Edit)" – 4:08
"Labrea Tarpit" – 1:58
"Pancake Cleaner" – 3:15
"You're Just Jealous" – 2:58
"House Of Pancake" – 6:31

Singles
The song "Park the Car by the Side of the Road" is a remixed and partially re-recorded version of the version appearing on the band's "Error" 7-inch recorded in 1991. The band had recorded a new arrangement of the song for the album, but shelved it in favor of this touched up version of the original.
Taang! also released a 7-inch version of the Brokedick Car EP  with the alternate mix of "Wrong Tube" as the A-side and "Labrea Tarpit"/"You're Just Jealous" as the B-side 
One additional song, "Trudy", was also recorded for the Blonder Tongue album, but was also shelved. The song was however re-recorded on 8-track in late 1993 and appeared as the November release of Simple Machines' 1994 Working Holiday! split 7-inch series. The 8-track version was released again a decade later as a bonus track on the Japanese release of Cats of the Wild (Vol. 2).
A lo-fi 4-track demo version of "His Love Just Washed Away" from 1991 was released on a split single with the band Iris in 1996. The Swirlies' track is followed by sped-up tape of an impromptu project called the Montclair Punk Rockers.
A 1994 Peel Session of "Jeremy Parker" (with some Alan Parsons Project lyrics adlibbed by Seana) would later make up the A-side of the group's "Orca vs. Dragon" single.

Personnel 

 Damon Tuntunjian – Guitar, Vocals, Casio VL-5, Minimoog, Chamberlin (incorrectly listed in the liner notes as a Mellotron)
 Seana Carmody – Guitar, Vocals, Minimoog, Chamberlin (incorrectly listed in the liner notes as a Mellotron)
 Andy Bernick – Bass, Radio, Artwork
 Ben Drucker – Drums (7, 8, 9 on Blonder Tongue, 2, 4 on Brokedick Car)
 Kevin March (Dambuilders) – Drums (2,10 on Blonder Tongue, 1 on Brokedick Car))
 Mark "Spongey" Rivers (Cavedogs) – Drums (3, 4, 6 on Blonder Tongue, 3 on Brokedick Car, as well as the outtakes for "Park the Car" and "Trudy")
 Ron Regé, Jr. – Art Direction, Design; Masking tape pull recordist on "Bell (Prelude)"
 Morgan Andrews – Chimp guitar on "His Life of Academic Freedom"
 Peter J. Haskett and Raymond Huffman – Prelude to "Park the Car (by the Side of the Road)"
 Dan – Moth talk recordist
 Sentridoh and Madbox – Moth talk ambient and cover-up music
 Swirlies – Producer, Mixing, Engineer
 Rich Costey – Engineer, Mixing, Co-Producer
 Kerri Bennet – Artwork, Art Direction, Design

References

External links
information about the original Blonder-Tongue Audio Baton e.q. unit
Swirlies official discography - links to a download

1993 debut albums
Swirlies albums
Taang! Records albums
Albums produced by Rich Costey